Johann Ludvig Zinn (14 September 1734 – 3 February 1802) was a German-Danish merchant who founded a trading house in Copenhagen in 1765 and died as one of the wealthiest men in the city. Zinn lived in the Zinn House at Kvæsthusgade 3 in Copenhagen. His daughter, Sophie Dorothea Zinn, wrote about her father in her memoirs, Grandma's Confessions.

Early life and education
Zinn was born in Mainbernheim in Bavaria. His parents were Johann Friederich Zinn  and Dorothea Barbara Zinn, née Kreis. It is unclear whether he was related to the renowned botanist Johann Gottfried Zinn (1727–1759), who came from the same region (Ansbach) and who gave his name to the Zinnia flower.

Career and public life
Instigated by Johan Friederich Wewer, Zinn came to Denmark in 1757 where he initially worked for Fabritius & Wewer. He established his own trading house in 1765, and was appointed Royal Agent in 1779.

Zinn served as a commercial specialist judge at Copenhagen's Maritime Court and was a member of the city's Council of 32 Men in 1772–1802. He also served as statutory auditor in Danish Asia Company.

Personal life and legacy
 
Zinn married Johanna Charlotta Sophia Preisler (15 June 1754 – 3 September 1833) on 15 September 1771, daughter of professor Johan Martin Preisler at the Royal Danish Academy of Fine Arts, who himself descended from a long line of German painters, and Anna S. Schuckmann (1720–1800). She was the sister of Danish actor Joachim Daniel Preisler (1755–1809), himself married to actress Marie Cathrine Preisler (1761–1797), as well as of engraver  (1757–1831).

 
The family lived in the Zinn House at Kvæsthusgade 3. Zinn was naturalized in 1793 and donated a ballot box in silver to the city of Copenhagen to show his gratitude for the way he had been received.

He died a very wealthy man on 3 February 1802 and is buried in Frederick's German Church. His two sons, Carl Ludvig Zinn (1777–1808) and Johann Friedrich Zinn (1779–1838) took on the company after their father's death. In 1809 it was the second-largest company in Copenhagen based on tax income. Carl Ludvig Zinn bought Vodroffsgård in 1803 but died in 1808.The company was later passed on to Johann Friedrichs Zinn 's son Ludvig Maximilian Zinn (1808–1868). His sister, Emma Sophie Amalia, married the composer Johan Peter Emilius Hartmann.

See also
 Hinrich Ladiges

References

External links

 Johan Ludvig Zim at geni.com
 Source
 Source
 Spurce

18th-century Danish businesspeople
Danish merchants
German emigrants to Denmark
Businesspeople from Copenhagen
Companies established in 1765
Burials at Christian's Church, Copenhagen
Danish company founders